Wigmore may refer to:

People
Ann Wigmore, U.S. holistic health practitioner
Ben Wigmore (b. 1982), Australian baseball player
Clive Wigmore (1892–1969), English footballer
Gillian Wigmore (b. 1976), Canadian poet
Gin Wigmore (b. 1986), New Zealand singer-songwriter
John Henry Wigmore (1863–1943), U.S. jurist, or his book, Treatise on the Anglo-American System of Evidence in Trials at Common Law (often known as "Wigmore on Evidence" or "Wigmore")
Joseph Wigmore (b. 1892), English footballer
Lionel Wigmore (1899–1989), Australian military historian and journalist
Lucy Wigmore, New Zealand actress
Robert Wigmore (b. 1949), Cook Islands politician
Rupert Wilson Wigmore (1873–1939), Canadian politician
Walter Wigmore (1873–1931), English footballer
William Campion (Jesuit), alias William Wigmore, (1599–1665), an English Jesuit

Places
Wigmore, Luton, Bedfordshire, England
Wigmore, Herefordshire, England
Wigmore, Kent, England
Wigmore Street, in the West End of London

Buildings
Wigmore Abbey, Herefordshire, England, a ruined Augustinian abbey 
Wigmore Castle, Herefordshire, England, a ruined castle 
Wigmore Hall, London, a concert hall

Other
Wigmore Athletic, a former football club in Sussex, England (merged into Worthing United F.C.)